The Pearson Triton, sometimes referred to as a Triton 28, is an American sailboat that was designed by Carl Alberg as  a racer-cruiser and first built in 1958. It was introduced at the 1959 National Boat Show in New York City and was one of the first fiberglass boat designs built. The design also launched Alberg's career as a naval architect.

The design was built by a number of different manufacturers in several configurations.

Production
The Triton started with a conversation between Carl Alberg and yacht broker Tom Potter in 1959. Potter thought that there would be a good market for a 28-foot racer-cruiser boat with stand-up headroom, with sleeping accommodation for a family of four and that would cost less than US$10,000. Alberg designed the boat, with classic lines, but made from a new material at the time, fiberglass and with a price of US$9,700.

Alberg and Potter approached the Pearson Corporation, at that time a small fiberglass sailboat manufacturer, founded in 1956 by cousins Clint and Everett Pearson. Upon examining the design they agreed to produce it. The two cousins had to borrow the money needed to transport the prototype from Rhode Island to New York for the National Boat Show, but by the show's completion they had 17 orders for the design.

The design was initially built by Pearson Yachts in Portsmouth, Rhode Island, United States. It was also built under licence by Jouët of France, who built about 60, and Aeromarine Plastics in California, who built 150 examples. Pearson ended production in 1967. Over 700 were built in total, before production ended in 1968.

Design
The Triton is a recreational keelboat, built predominantly of fiberglass. It was inspired by the lines of the traditional Scandinavian Folkboat. It has a spooned raked stem, a raised transom, a keel-mounted rudder controlled by a tiller and a fixed long keel.

The boat was factory fitted with a Universal Atomic 4  gasoline engine.

The boat's galley is located on both sides of the cabin at the bottom of the companionway stairs. On the starboard side is a sink that can be covered for use as a chart table. There is also a two-burner LPG stove. The head has a privacy door and is located forward, just aft of the bow "V"-berth. Additional sleeping space is provided by two cabin berths, providing total sleeping space for four.

The genoas have tracks and the mainsail can be roller reefed. There is an anchor locker in the bow.

Operational history
A review in Blue Water Boats writing in 2012 noted, "The Triton sails as gracefully as she looks. She’s forgiving and nimble, though she does tend to exhibit weather helm. To counter this tendency some owners have fashioned small bowsprits to open up the fore-triangle area, while others recut their mainsail with less canvas at the sacrifice of overall sail area. Although a fast boat for her waterline length she’s slow by today’s standards and she doesn’t point very high. Her short waterline means her light air performance is respectable, and as the wind picks up she heels quickly which increases her LWL and therefore hull speed. The boat is relatively tender up to 15 degrees before she stiffens. West Coast boats, being heavier built, are generally stiffer while East coast boats tend to heel earlier but are more responsive."

American Sailboat Hall of Fame
The Triton was inducted into the now-defunct Sail America American Sailboat Hall of Fame in 1995. In honoring the design, the hall cited, "A telltale of success is durability and since the boats were built in the infancy of fiberglass construction, they were laid up by hand with more than a few layers of glass in the hulls. The boats will last forever, and the Triton Class Association gathers every year for a National Championship. Successful, ground-breaking, popular, vital – the signs of a classic."

Variants
Pearson Triton
This model was introduced in 1958 and produced by Pearson in Portsmouth, Rhode Island until 1967.
Pearson Triton Yawl
This model was introduced in 1958 and produced by Pearson.
Aeromarine Triton
This model was introduced in 1960 and built by Aeromarine Plastic in California, who built 150 of them.
Jouët Triton
This model was introduced in 1965 and built by Jouët in France. The deck and coach house roof were redesigned to incorporate a forward cabin windshield, a feature of many Jouët boat designs. About 60 Jouët Tritons were completed.

See also
List of sailing boat types

Related development
Alberg 35

Similar sailboats
Albin Vega

References

Keelboats
1950s sailboat type designs
Sailing yachts
Sailboat type designs by Carl Alberg
Sailboat types built by Pearson Yachts
Sailboat types built by Aeromarine Plastics
Sailboat types built by Jouët